Worcester is an unincorporated community in Worcester Township in Montgomery County, Pennsylvania, United States. Worcester is located at the intersection of Pennsylvania Route 73 and Pennsylvania Route 363. The name of the village and township is locally pronounced 'WOR-ses-ter.'

References

Unincorporated communities in Montgomery County, Pennsylvania
Unincorporated communities in Pennsylvania